NObjective is a Mono to Cocoa bridge.

NObjective is high-performance bridge between managed .NET and unmanaged Cocoa worlds. It provides automatically generated proxies for all Objective-C classes and can be used to export managed classes to unmanaged Objective-C runtime.

Key features:
 Lowest processor and memory overheads compared to similar bridges; see project page for performance benchmark results
 Ability to automatically import Objective-C classes
 Essential enums and structs are also automatically imported
 Ability to export .NET Framework classes to Objective-C runtime
 Ability to rethrow exceptions across runtimes in both directions
 Ability to work on Mac OS X Tiger, Mac OS X Leopard

See also
 Cocoa (API)
 Mono (software)
 Cocoa Sharp
 Monobjc
 PyObjC
 RubyCocoa

External links
 
 Mono website

MacOS programming tools